Richard Charkin (born 17 June 1949) is a British publishing executive. He has held executive positions at Pergamon Press, Oxford University Press, Reed International/Reed Elsevier and Current Science Group, and is the former Chief Executive of Macmillan Publishers Limited and Executive Director of Verlagsgruppe Georg von Holtzbrinck. In 2015, he became President of the International Publishers Association. He was Executive Director of Bloomsbury from 2007 to 2018 and is currently President of Bloomsbury China and of John Wisden. He is also a non-executive director of Institute of Physics Publishing, and is Chair of Common Purpose.

He serves on the International Advisory Board of the Frankfurt Book Fair and the Editorial Board of Logos as well as teaching on the publishing courses at University College London, City University of London, and University of the Arts London. He has founded and manages Mensch Publishing.

Charkin has an MA in Natural Sciences from Trinity College, Cambridge. He was a Supernumerary Fellow of Green College, Oxford and is currently visiting professor at the University of the Arts London.

Publications 
Charkin Blog, The Archive, Macmillan, 2008.
The Lowdown: top tips for wannabe CEOs (with Richard Pettinger), Creative Content Ltd, 2009
Publishing Perspectives articles

References

British publishers (people)
Living people
Alumni of Trinity College, Cambridge
Fellows of Green Templeton College, Oxford
1949 births